Keshav Bansal is an Indian entrepreneur. He is the director of Intex Technologies, an Indian consumer durables, which is India's second-largest selling mobile phone and IT accessories manufacturer company. He was the owner of the dissolved Rajkot-based team, Gujarat Lions in the Indian Premier League. 
He is also the youngest owner of an Indian Premier League Team. GQ India named him as #9 among the 50 Most Influential Young Indians for 2016.

Early life and educationBansal was born and brought up in New Delhi and he did his schooling from The Heritage School in Vasant Kunj, New Delhi. He is the son of Narendra Bansal, who founded Intex Technologies in 1996. Currently, Keshav Bansal, is the active director of the company.

He pursued Management Studies at IILM Institute for Higher Education in New Delhi after spending a year at the Alliance Manchester Business School. He is also a fitness enthusiast, former state-level tennis player

Business career 
Bansal started with the Logistics Department of Intex Technologies (owned by his father Narendra Bansal) in the year 2012. He later worked with the marketing department and took over as director in the year 2013. In 2016, Bansal bought the Rajkot based IPL franchise Gujarat Lions. The acquisition made him the youngest owner of an IPL team.

Awards/recognition 
 2016 #9 on the list of Top 50 most influential young Indians by GQ India
 2016 Amity Leadership Award for Business Excellence, 2016 by Amity Education Group
 2016 Extraordinaire Award for The Dynamic Young Leader by Times Now
 2013 Young Entrepreneur of the Year 2013 by NCN Magazine

See also 

 List of Indian entrepreneurs
 Intex Technologies
 Gujarat Lions

References

External links 
 Official website
 Keshav Bansal, standing tall in the big league at Sportskeeda
 Keshav Bansal's Interview at Times of India

Businesspeople from Delhi
1992 births
Living people
Indian Premier League franchise owners
People from New Delhi